Dylan Ferrandis (born 31 May 1994), is a French motorcycle racer from Avignon, France. Ferrandis competes in AMA Supercross and AMA Motorcross for Star Yamaha.

Career 
Ferrandis grew up in France, before moving to the United States to pursue a professional motocross career. Ferrandis won back to back 250 West titles in AMA Supercross in 2019 and 2020. Also in 2020, he won the 250 AMA Motocross Championship. Ferrandis subsequently moved up to the 450 class in 2021. In his rookie year, he won the 450 AMA Motocross Championship.

References

1994 births
Living people
French motocross riders
AMA Motocross Championship National Champions